Adhemarius gagarini is a species of moth in the family Sphingidae. It was described by Jose Francisco Zikán in 1935,

Description

Distribution 
Is known from Brazil, Bolivia and Guyana.

Biology 
There are probably at least two generations per year. In Bolivia, it has been recorded in October and December.

References

Adhemarius
Moths described in 1935
Moths of South America